Jeremy Wick is a Canadian-born Swiss professional ice hockey right winger who is currently playing for the SC Rapperswil-Jona Lakers of the National League (NL). He previously played with Genève-Servette HC.

Playing career
Wick played four seasons in the NCAA with St. Lawrence University.

On April 7, 2014, Wick signed a three-year contract with Genève-Servette HC of the National League (NL). He made his professional debut with Genève-Servette in the 2014-15 season and also spent parts of the season with their former affiliate, HC Red Ice of the Swiss League (SL).

On May 24, 2016, Wick was signed to a three-year contract extension by Geneva.

On December 11, 2019, Wick signed a two-year contract with the SC Rapperswil-Jona Lakers starting with the 2020/21 season and through the 2021/22 season.

References

External links

1989 births
Living people
Canadian people of Swiss descent
HC Red Ice players
Genève-Servette HC players
St. Lawrence Saints men's ice hockey players
SC Rapperswil-Jona Lakers players
Swiss ice hockey right wingers
People from Dufferin County